Yevseyevo is the name of several rural localities in Russia:
Yevseyevo, Moscow, a village in Desenovskoye Settlement of the federal city of Moscow
Yevseyevo, Moscow Oblast, a village in Ulitinskoye Rural Settlement of Pavlovo-Posadsky District in Moscow Oblast; 
Yevseyevo, Pskov Oblast, a village in Pskovsky District of Pskov Oblast
Yevseyevo, Yaroslavl Oblast, a village in Veskovsky Rural Okrug of Pereslavsky District in Yaroslavl Oblast